The Grootslang or Grote Slang (Afrikaans and Dutch for "big snake") is a legendary creature that is reputed to dwell in a deep cave in the Richtersveld, South Africa.

Legend
The Grootslang is said to be a huge serpent that dwells in a cave known as the "Wonder Hole" or the "Bottomless Pit". According to local legend, the cave is filled with diamonds. The cave is sometimes described as instead connecting to the Orange River by a natural pipe through which the diamonds are gradually funneled into the current. A large pool beneath the King George Cataract at Aughrabies Falls is also said to be a lair of the Grootslang and a source of diamonds. Here, the creature is reputed to be coiled around a great hoard of gold and gems

In The Glamour of Prospecting, the South African gold prospector F. C. Cornell describes the "Groot Slang" as a large snake said to live within a large rock in the middle of the Orange River, and to take cattle from the river's banks. Belief in this creature is described as ubiquitous among the local Khoekhoe (described by Cornell as "Richtersfeld Hottentots") and some white settlers, who greatly fear the serpent.

In appearance, the serpent is said to be forty to fifty feet in length, and to leave a track three feet wide. Some legends describe it as having diamonds in its eye sockets. According to a version of the story reported among the Bushmen, the Grootslang is older than the world and will protect its treasure for eternity. Another form of the myth states that the Grootslang is a spirit tasked with guarding its cavern from treasure seekers, and that its presence is marked by an overpowering "sense of evil".

While searching for treasure in the Richtersveld of South Africa in 1917, the English businessman Peter Grayson disappeared after members of his party were attacked and injured by lions, prompting rumors that the Grootslang had killed him.

According to legend, only one person entered the Wonder Hole and returned. This was a prospector who used a cable winch to descend into the cave until he reached a ledge. There, he saw tunnels leading further in and smelled a strong scent of sulfur, but dropped his electric torch when bats flew towards him and had to be pulled back up. He did not descend into the cave again.

Origin
In Where Men Still Dream, the South African journalist and author Lawrence G. Green speculates that the legend of the Grootslang originated from sightings of native pythons, which can reach twenty-five feet in length. Additional details of the myth, such as its size in excess of real pythons and diamonds in the creature's eye sockets, are dismissed by Green as narrative exaggerations.

In popular culture
 A Grootslang was featured in The Secret Saturdays episode "Something in the Water". It is depicted as a four-tusked green-skinned elephant with ram-like horns and a spiked snake-like tail. The Saturdays had to relocate a Grootslang away from settlements by baiting it with a large piece of pork.
 A Grootslang was featured in the Lumberjanes vol. 3 as a creature creating a massive snow storm threatening the camp.
 In Kingdom Rush: Origins, in the stage The Crystal Lake, a Grootslang appears in the crystal river. It uses its breath to crystalize towers.

References

Legendary serpents
South African legendary creatures